Green Archers United Futbol Club, formerly known as Alabang Grins Futbol Club, was a Filipino professional association football club based in Lipa, Batangas, Philippines. The team last played in the 2019 season of the Philippines Football League, the top-level league in the Philippines. They have also participated in the United Football League.

It was founded in 1998 by football players from the De La Salle University, which are known as the "Green Archers" in the UAAP.

History

2012 UFL season 
Green Archers United is one of the founding members of the United Football League and playing in Division 1 since the league started as semi-professional in 2009. In 2012 UFL season, they finished 8th in the table.

Green Archers United finished 4th in the 2012 UFL Cup. They were beaten by eventual champions Stallion (1–3) in the semi-finals and 3rd placed Loyola (1–4) in the 3rd place play-off.

2013 PFF National Men's Club Championship
The Green Archers United qualified in the 2013 PFF National Men's Club Championship Round of 16 after they ranked in the Top 10 of 2012 UFL Cup. They finished 4th in 2013 PFF National Men's Club Championship after they were beaten by Kaya in the 3rd place play-offs.

Weekend Futbol League Elite
Green Archers United was among the teams that applied to participate in the inaugural season of the Philippines Football League (PFL) in 2017 but later decided to withdraw its application. The club decision was due to uncertainties in raising funds to pay for the leagues  franchise fee and expressed readiness in joining if club finds the league's rules as consistent enough. Instead of playing in the PFL inaugural season, the club decided to play in the Weekend Futbol League Elite finishing as runners-up to Kaya FC-Makati's reserves in the 2017 season.

Philippines Football League
Green Archers United formally expressed interest to join the Philippine Premier League (PPL), the intended successor league of the Philippines Football League (PFL) in December 2018 Their only match in the short-lived PPL which only had one match day was a 0–3 loss to Kaya–Iloilo on April 27, 2019. The PPL folded when the Philippine Football Federation withdrew its sanction of the league's operators and decided to revive the PFL within the same year.

The club was among the seven teams to participate in the 2019 season of the revived PFL league. They decided to enter the league after withdrawing its plans to do the same for the inaugural season of the PFL in 2017. This is due to a more lenient finance policies imposed in the 2019 season, which allowed freedom for clubs to sign in more sponsors than in previous iterations of the PFL. Green Archers United considered designating the Aboitiz Pitch in Lipa, Batangas, the PFF National Training Centre in Carmona, Cavite, and the Rizal Memorial Stadium as its home venue starting the 2019 PFL season. The Green Archers decided to set the Lipa facility as their home venue, with their 4–0 win over Philippine Air Force on August 4, 2019 as their first official home match.

Green Archers United decided not participate in 2020 season citing unsatisfactory media coverage of the PFL during the 2019 season. Amidst the COVID-19 pandemic, the team has disbanded.

Kit manufacturers and shirt sponsors

1Major shirt sponsor (names located at the front of the shirt).
2Secondary sponsor (names mostly located at the back of the shirt).

Players

First team squad

Foreign players
In the Philippine Premier League, there can be at up to four non-Filipino nationals in a team as long as they are registered. Foreign players who have acquired permanent residency can be registered as locals.

 Henry Bandeken
 Fredy Mbang
 Joel Okono
 Stephen Appiah

Records

Key
Tms. = Number of teams
Pos. = Position in league
TBD  = To be determined
DNQ  = Did not qualify
Note: Performances of the club indicated here was after the UFL created (as a semi-pro league) in 2009.

Head coaches
Coaches by years (2011–present)

Honors

Domestic

Leagues
 WFL Elite Futbol League
Champions (1): 2018
Runners-up (1): 2017

Cups
 UFL Cup
Third (1): 2013

 UFL Pre-season Cup
Third (1): 2013

References

External links

 Green Archers United F.C. on United Football League website

Football clubs in the Philippines
1998 establishments in the Philippines
2020 disestablishments in the Philippines
Association football clubs established in 1998
Association football clubs disestablished in 2020
Sports teams in Metro Manila
Sports in Batangas
Defunct football clubs in the Philippines